Jennifer Oeser (born 29 November 1983 in Brunsbüttel, Schleswig-Holstein) is a retired German heptathlete.

Career
Oeser's first international championship was the 2002 World Junior Championships in Athletics and she finished in eighth place with a score of 5405 points. She improved her personal best to 5901 points to win the gold medal at the 2003 European Athletics U23 Championships. Moving up to the senior ranks, she finished fourth in the heptathlon at the 2006 European Athletics Championships in Gothenburg and was seventh in the event at the 2007 World Championships in Athletics. Oeser was eleventh at the 2008 Summer Olympics in Beijing. She set a personal best of 6493 points to win the silver medal in the heptathlon at the 2009 IAAF World Championships in Berlin. The following year she was at the Erdgas Meeting in Ratingen, Germany, holding off her domestic rival Lilli Schwarzkopf to win with a total of 6427.

Personal bests

Major competition record

References

External links
 
 Leverkusen who's who

1983 births
Living people
People from Brunsbüttel
German heptathletes
Athletes (track and field) at the 2008 Summer Olympics
Athletes (track and field) at the 2012 Summer Olympics
Athletes (track and field) at the 2016 Summer Olympics
Olympic athletes of Germany
World Athletics Championships medalists
European Athletics Championships medalists
World Athletics Championships athletes for Germany
Sportspeople from Schleswig-Holstein
20th-century German women
21st-century German women